Nathon Allen (born 28 October 1995) is a Jamaican track and field athlete who competes in sprinting events. Allen of St. Jago High School and Twayne Crooks of Kingston College are the two school boys named to represent Jamaica at second staging of the World Relays in Nassau.  He won an Olympic silver medal as a member of the Jamaican 4×400 m relay team.

Allen ran for Auburn University, under coach Henry Rolle. He was also an individual finalist in the 400 meters at the 2017 World Championships, finishing fifth.

Personal bests

References

External links

Nathon Allen at OmRiyadat
 

1995 births
Living people
Jamaican male sprinters
Athletes (track and field) at the 2016 Summer Olympics
Olympic athletes of Jamaica
Olympic silver medalists for Jamaica
Olympic silver medalists in athletics (track and field)
Medalists at the 2016 Summer Olympics
World Athletics Championships athletes for Jamaica
Auburn Tigers men's track and field athletes
World Athletics Championships medalists
Athletes (track and field) at the 2020 Summer Olympics
21st-century Jamaican people